Daniel Fox may refer to:
Daniel Fox (chemist) (1927–1989), American polymer chemist
Daniel Fox (field hockey) (born 1983), British field hockey player
Daniel Fox (swimmer) (born 1994), Australian Paralympic swimmer
Danny Fox (born 1986), British footballer
Danny Fox (artist), British artist
Daniel M. Fox (1809–1890), mayor of Philadelphia, Pennsylvania from 1869 to 1872
Daniel Fox (Lil' Dan), percussionist for the band Mushroomhead & Drummer for Ventana
Dan Fox (American football) (born 1991), American football linebacker
Daniel Fox, a contestant in series 6 of the British TV series The X Factor
Daniel J. Fox, Connecticut state representative

See also
Daniel Fox Sandford (1831–1906), Bishop of Tasmania, 1883–1889